Rock Point Community School (RCPS) is a school in Rock Point, Arizona. It is directly operated by the Bureau of Indian Education (BIE). It employs some 90–100 faculty members. It is split into elementary (K–6) and secondary (7–12) units which is overlooked by a  Chief Executive Officer and their own principals. It offers fully bilingual English and Navajo language education.

 it had about 400 students including those from, in addition to Rock Point: Mexican Water, Rough Rock, Round Rock, and Sweetwater.

History
The Bureau of Indian Affairs (BIA) established the school in 1935. The school previously functioned as a boarding school.  it only takes day students now.

References

Public high schools in Arizona
Native American schools in Arizona
Education on the Navajo Nation
Public elementary schools in Arizona
Public middle schools in Arizona
Public K-12 schools in the United States
Public boarding schools in the United States
Boarding schools in Arizona
1935 establishments in Arizona
Educational institutions established in 1935